The 2007–08 CEV Cup was the 36th edition of the European CEV Cup volleyball club tournament, the former Top Teams Cup.

Roma Volley beat Noliko Maaseik in the finale. Italian Manuel Coscione was awarded a title of the Most Valuable Player.

Participating teams

Reglament
When the two matches result in one win and one defeat for each team, the teams must play one
extra set called GOLDEN SET. The Golden Set is to be played as a tie break set until 15 points.
The team winning this GOLDEN SET will qualify for the next round regardless the results of the
previous matches.

Main phase

16th Finals
The 16 winning teams from the 1/16 Finals will compete in the 1/8 Finals playing Home & Away matches. The losers of the 1/16 final matches qualify for the 3rd round in 2007–08 CEV Challenge Cup.

|}

First leg

|}

Second leg

|}

8th Finals

|}

First leg

|}

Second leg

|}

4th Finals

|}

First leg

|}

Second leg

|}

Challenge phase

|}

First leg 

|}

Second leg 

|}

Final phase
Venue:  Rome

Semi finals

|}

3rd place

|}

Final

|}

Final standing

Awards

Most Valuable Player
  Manuel Coscione (Roma Volley)
Best Setter
  Nuno Pinheiro (Noliko Maaseik)
Best Receiver
  Nicholas Cundy (Noliko Maaseik)

Best Blocker
  Luigi Mastrangelo (Roma Volley)
Best Spiker
  Ivan Miljković (Roma Volley)
Best Server
  Luigi Mastrangelo (Roma Volley)
Best Scorer
  Krasimir Stefanov (Budvanska Rivijera Budva)

References

External links
 Official site

2007-08
2007 in volleyball
2008 in volleyball